Federico Domínguez is the name of two footballers:

 Federico Domínguez (footballer, born 1976), defender for Club Atlético Vélez Sarsfield
 Federico Domínguez (footballer, born 1991), midfielder for Nea Salamis Famagusta FC